Marshall Howe may refer to:

Marshall Avery Howe (1867–1936), American botanist
Marshall Otis Howe (1832–1919), American politician from Vermont